Diatraea andina is a moth in the family Crambidae. It was described by Harold Edmund Box in 1951. It is found in Venezuela.

References

Chiloini
Moths described in 1951